Ephedra fasciculata is a species of plant in the Ephedraceae family. Common names are Arizona ephedra, Arizona jointfir, and desert Mormon-tea.

Distribution 
The plant is found in the Mojave Desert and Colorado Desert of California, the Sonoran Desert in Arizona, Nevada, southern California, and Utah.  Ephedra fasciculata grows in Creosote-bush scrub (Larrea tridentata), below .

Varieties 
 Ephedra fasciculata var. clokeyi (H. C. Cutler) Clokey
 Ephedra fasciculata var. fasciculata

References

External links 

 Jepson Manual Treatment: Ephedra fasciculata
 Flora of North America
 USDA Plants Profile: Ephedra fasciculata (Arizona jointfir)
 Ephedra fasciculata herbarium photo
Ephedra fasciculata Photos and Herbarium (SEINet)

fasciculata
North American desert flora
Flora of the California desert regions
Flora of the Southwestern United States
Flora of the Sonoran Deserts
Natural history of the Mojave Desert
Plants described in 1934